The Junior women's race at the 2015 IAAF World Cross Country Championships was held at the Guiyang horse racing circuit in Guiyang, China, on March 28, 2015.  Reports of the event were given for the IAAF.

Complete results for individuals, and for teams were published.

Race results

Junior women's race (6 km)

Individual

Teams

Note: Athletes in parentheses did not score for the team result.

Participation
According to an unofficial count, 100 athletes from 28 countries participated in the Junior women's race.

See also
 2015 IAAF World Cross Country Championships – Senior men's race
 2015 IAAF World Cross Country Championships – Junior men's race
 2015 IAAF World Cross Country Championships – Senior women's race

References

Junior women's race at the World Athletics Cross Country Championships
IAAF World Cross Country Championships
2015 in women's athletics
2015 in youth sport